Scott Harding (born 19 June 1986) is a former Australian rules footballer who played for the Brisbane Lions and Port Adelaide Football Club in the Australian Football League (AFL).

Early life
Harding was born on Thursday Island in Far North Queensland to mother Tulaga Paitela from the Polynesian nation of Tuvalu and father Russell (a Queensland Australian Football League player and coach). Scott was educated at the Anglican Church Grammar School.

AFL career
Scott Harding was drafted as a rookie by the Brisbane Lions in the 2005 AFL Draft from local Brisbane club Morningside. He played well in the 2006 NAB Cup leading to debut selection in R\round 1, 2006 against Geelong.  He initially wore number 45 but in 2007 switched to number 5, previously worn by dual-premiership player, Brad Scott.

At the end of the 2009 season, he was delisted by the Brisbane Lions, but was later drafted by Port Adelaide in the 2009 preseason draft. He was delisted by the Power at the end of 2010.

American football
On 27 May 2011, it was announced that Harding had been awarded a scholarship to play for the University of Hawaii Warriors following a successful trial there.  Unlike most Australians who have transitioned to play American football as punters, Harding played as a punt returner and wide receiver. Following the departure of head coach of Greg McMackin and the arrival of Norm Chow, Harding spent additional time as the starting punter and also spent time as a holder.

Personal life
His sister, Emma Hunt, is married to rugby league footballer (and former Australian rules footballer) Karmichael Hunt.

See also
VFL/AFL players with international backgrounds

References

External links

 

1986 births
Living people
Australian rules footballers from Queensland
Brisbane Lions players
Morningside Australian Football Club players
Port Adelaide Football Club players
Port Adelaide Football Club players (all competitions)
Australian people of Tuvaluan descent
Hawaii Rainbow Warriors football players
Australian expatriate sportspeople in the United States
People educated at Anglican Church Grammar School